Macleaniella is a genus of deep-sea limpets in the family Cocculinidae.

Species
Species within the genus Macleaniella include:

 Macleaniella moskalevi Leal & Harasewych, 1999

Distribution
Macleaniella moskalevi is endemic to Puerto Rico Trench.

Description
The shell of Macleaniella moskalevi is small and cap-shaped. The maximum recorded shell length is 5.17 mm.

Habitat 
Minimum recorded depth is 5184 m. Maximum recorded depth is 8595 m.

Life cycle 
Simultaneous hermaphrodites.

References

External links

Cocculinidae
Monotypic gastropod genera